Antsukh is a rural locality (a selo) in Chadakolobsky Selsoviet, Tlyaratinsky District, Republic of Dagestan, Russia. The population was 97 as of 2010.

Geography 
Antsukh is located 13 km north of Tlyarata (the district's administrative centre) by road. Gebguda and Katroso are the nearest rural localities.

References 

Rural localities in Tlyaratinsky District